Albert Strange (1855–1917) was an English artist and yacht designer.  He was the headmaster of the Scarborough School of Art.  With George Holmes, he was a mainstay of the Humber Yawl Club which developed the use of sailing canoes with a yawl rig.

Early life and education
Albert Strange was born in 1855, growing up in Gravesend where he learned to sail with a fisherman who helped him convert a peter boat for cruising around the Thames Estuary.  He studied art at the Slade School of Fine Art and the Leicester College of Arts and Crafts, completing his education in 1878.  He then taught art in Liverpool for three years, where he married.

Circa 1882, Strange took a job as the headmaster of the new Scarborough School of Art — a position which he held for 35 years until his death.  He exhibited at the Royal Academy, from 1882 to 1897.

Scarborough and the Humber Yawl Club
For some years, Strange was captain of the Humber Yawl Club, (formed in 1883), shortly after his arrival in Scarborough about 50 miles to the north. He produced many designs for boats suited to the club's locale, both for himself and other members.  They were light craft which would cope well with being beached on the mud flats of the Humber Estuary or being shipped abroad as deck cargo, but they had cabins which enabled them to be used for long voyages of a month or so. One of his designs was the 15m cutter rig yacht Tally Ho.

Designs

Albert Strange Association 
There is an active Association which has as its mission to "“To trace, record and, so far as it is within our power, preserve the designs, boats, art works and writings of Albert Strange and to make a permanent record of his life and work”. (from the Association's Constitution - quoted on the ASA website - see below). The Association holds Summer Meets (usually on the UK's East coast) where yachts built to Albert Strange designs meet, and share with others the opportunity to sail these craft.
The Association's website (see below)contains much further information on his life and the breadth and diversity of his abilities;  his success as an artist, yacht designer, raconteur and teacher of pupils across a wide range of ages.

References

7.     Jamie Clay and Mark Miller (1999), Albert Strange on Yacht Design, Construction and Cruising, ISBN 0952616009

External links
 The Albert Strange Association

1855 births
1917 deaths
Place of birth missing
British yacht designers
People from Gravesend, Kent
People from Scarborough, North Yorkshire
British marine artists